is a josei manga magazine published by Ichijinsha and launched in March 2002. Its volumes usually contain over 600 pages and tackles a variety of genres, with well-known manga like Saiyuki Reload, Amatsuki, 07-Ghost and Loveless often making appearances in its pages. A special shōjo manga edition called  launched in 2003 as a quarterly magazine, but has since shifted to a bimonthly issue as of 2008.

Serialized manga

Monthly Comic Zero Sum
#000000 ~ultra black~
+C Sword and Cornett
07-Ghost
Ada Senki
Ai Ni Toshi no Sanante
Absorb Ability
Amatsuki
Are you Alice?
Battle Rabbits
Bibliophile Princess
Dazzle (originally published in Monthly G-Fantasy)
Di(e)ce
Dolls
 Fire Emblem if: Crown of Nibelungen
Gemeinschaft
Karneval
Landreaall
Loveless
Magical × Miracle
Makai Ōji: Devils and Realist
My Next Life as a Villainess: All Routes Lead to Doom!
Phantom of the Idol
Saiyuki Reload
Saiyuki Reload Blast
Strange+
Tenkyuugi - Sephirahnatus
Tousei Gensou Hakubutsushi
Vampire Doll: Guilt-Na-Zan
Weiß Side B (transferred to Zero Sum WARD after the February 2006 issue)
Xenosaga Episode I: Der Wille zur Macht
Zion

Comic Zero Sum WARD
Our Miracle
Saiyuki Gaiden (originally published in Monthly G-Fantasy)
Saiyuki Ibun
Wild Adapter

Zero Sum Online
The High School Life of a Fudanshi
Jingai-san no Yome
The Most Heretical Last Boss Queen

References

External links
Official website 

2002 establishments in Japan
Monthly manga magazines published in Japan
Magazines established in 2002
Shōjo manga magazines
Josei manga magazines
Ichijinsha magazines

ru:Ichijinsha#Comic Zero-Sum